Langston Branden Walker (born September 3, 1979) is a former American football offensive tackle in the National Football League (NFL). He was drafted by the Oakland Raiders in the second round of the 2002 NFL Draft and has also played for the Buffalo Bills. Walker played college football at California. He resides in his hometown of Oakland.

Early years
Walker attended Bishop O’Dowd High School where he was an all-state offensive lineman, having helped Bishop O’Dowd to a 10-1 record as a senior after an 11-2 mark the previous year. He also played defense as a lineman.

Professional career

First stint with Raiders
Walker was frequently used as a field goal blocker. He blocked a potential game-winning field goal against the Denver Broncos on November 28, 2004.

Buffalo Bills
Walker was the starting right tackle for the Bills since coming to Buffalo as an unrestricted free agent March 2, 2007. Walker and the Bills agreed to a 5-year, $25 million contract with a $10 million signing bonus.

Walker started all 16 games in 2007. He was part of offensive line that allowed only 26 sacks, the fewest allowed by Buffalo since sacks became an official NFL statistic in 1982. He helped pave the way for over 100 yards rushing in 11 of 16 games and a 112.5 yards per game rushing average.

In 2008 Walker hosted the internet series 68 Seconds with Langston Walker.

Despite being expected to replace Jason Peters at left tackle in 2009, the Bills released Walker after failed attempts to trade him on September 8.

Second stint with Raiders
Walker was re-signed by the Oakland Raiders on October 14, 2009 and assigned No. 70. He was re-signed on April 2, 2010.

References

External links
Buffalo Bills bio
Oakland Raiders bio

1979 births
Living people
Players of American football from Oakland, California
American football offensive tackles
American football offensive guards
American football tight ends
California Golden Bears football players
Oakland Raiders players
Buffalo Bills players